Walter Stephen "Steve" Mott III (born March 24, 1961) is a former American football center in the National Football League. He was drafted by the Detroit Lions in the fifth round of the 1983 NFL Draft. He played college football at Alabama. Mott was Coach Paul "Bear" Bryant's last captain.

1961 births
Living people
Players of American football from New Orleans
American football centers
Alabama Crimson Tide football players
Detroit Lions players
Ed Block Courage Award recipients